Events in the year 1883 in India.

Incumbents
 Empress of India – Queen Victoria
 Viceroy of India – George Robinson, 1st Marquess of Ripon

Events
 National income –  4,213 million
 15 September – Bombay Natural History Society founded
 The Calcutta International Exhibition world's fair was held from the end of 1883 to March 1884

Law
 9 February – Viceroy Lord Ripon's partial reversal of the Ilbert Bill (1883), a legislative measure that had proposed putting Indian judges in the Bengal Presidency on equal footing with British ones, that transformed the discontent into political action.
Land Improvement Loans Act

Births
 Bhargavaram Viththal Varerkar, Marathi writer (d. 1964).

Deaths
 17 February – Vasudev Balwant Phadke, Indian revolutionary (b.1845).

References

 
India
Years of the 19th century in India